The 2011 America East Conference baseball tournament took place from May 25 through 27 at Joe Nathan Field in Stony Brook, New York.  The top four regular season finishers of the league's six teams qualified for the double-elimination tournament.  In the championship game, second-seeded Maine defeated fourth-seeded Albany, 10-1, to win its fifth tournament championship (its second under head coach Steve Trimper).  As a result, Maine received the America East's automatic bid to the 2011 NCAA Tournament.

Seeding
The top four finishers from the regular season were seeded one through four based on conference winning percentage only.  They then played in a double-elimination format.  In the first round, the one and four seeds were matched up in one game, while the two and three seeds were matched up in the other.

Results

All-Tournament Team
The following players were named to the All-Tournament Team.

Most Outstanding Player
Maine outfielder Taylor Lewis was named Most Outstanding Player.

References

America East Conference Baseball Tournament
Tournament
America East Conference Baseball
America East Conference baseball tournament
College baseball tournaments in New York (state)